Ministry of Maritime Affairs and Fisheries can refer to:
 Ministry of Marine Affairs and Fisheries (Indonesia)
 Ministry of Oceans and Fisheries (South Korea)